Taishan railway station may refer to:

  (泰山站), a station on Beijing–Shanghai railway in Taishan District, Tai'an, Shandong
 Taishan railway station (Guangdong) (台山站)

See also
Taishan Station (disambiguation)